Statistics of the lower tier of Swedish football Division 4 for the 2011 season.  These 5 divisions feed into the Halland and Småland Elit divisions in Division 4

League standings

Halland 2011

Småland Nordvästra 2011

Småland Nordöstra 2011

Småland Sydvästra 2011

Småland Sydöstra 2011

Footnotes

References 

Swedish Football Division 4 seasons
6